Domnell mac Áedh Ó Flaithbheartaigh, leader of Iar Connacht and Chief of the Name, died 1410.

Reign
Domnell was a son of Áedh Ó Flaithbheartaigh, who built the church at Annaghdown in 1410, but of whom few other particulars appear to be known.

Annalistic reference
 1410. Donnell, the son of Hugh O'Flaherty, Lord of West Connaught, was slain by the sons of Brian O'Flaherty, at a meeting of his own people.

See also
 Ó Flaithbertaigh

References
 West or H-Iar Connaught Ruaidhrí Ó Flaithbheartaigh, 1684 (published 1846, ed. James Hardiman).
 Origin of the Surname O'Flaherty, Anthony Matthews, Dublin, 1968, p. 40.
 CELT: Corpus of Electronic Texts at University College Cork

People from County Galway
Medieval Gaels from Ireland
Domnell
15th-century Irish people
1410 deaths
Year of birth unknown
Irish lords